The DTCN F17 was a wire-guided anti-surface ship torpedo originally produced in 1971. France, Spain, and Saudi Arabia were its primary users. As of 2021, there were still used on Pakistan Navy's Hashmat-class submarines.

A control panel above the launch platform allowed for instantaneous switching between two modes, wire-guided or autonomous passive homing.

References

 Submarines of the World, Jackson, Robert. Pg.290
 

Naval weapons of France
Torpedoes